Eddy Yusuf (4 December 1955 – 8 March 2022) was an Indonesian politician. A member of the Democratic Party and later the People's Conscience Party, he served as Deputy Governor of South Sumatra from 2008 to 2013 and Regent of Ogan Komering Ulu from 2003 to 2008. He died in Baturaja on 8 March 2022, at the age of 66.

References

1955 births
2022 deaths
Democratic Party (Indonesia) politicians
People's Conscience Party politicians
People from South Sumatra